Riverina is an Australian Geographical Indication (AGI) registered in the Register of Protected GIs as a wine region. The Riverina AGI is centred on Griffith and is roughly circular with towns on the boundary including Mossgiel, Condobolin, Temora, Junee, Culcairn, Berrigan, Barooga, Finley, Deniliquin and Moulamein. It does not extend as far south as the Murray River. As such, the Riverina wine region is smaller than the generally known Riverina area.

The Riverina region relies heavily on the Murrumbidgee Irrigation Scheme, initiated between 1906 and 1912 by Sir Samuel McCaughey.

References

Wine regions of New South Wales
Riverina